Michael Sutcliffe is the former municipal manager of the eThekwini Metropolitan Municipality (population 4 million), which includes the city of Durban, South Africa. He has been widely reported to be a controversial figure amongst Durbanites and has been the target of popular protest in the city.

Deployed to the position in 2002 by the ruling African National Congress, he oversaw the municipality's successful preparations for the 2010 FIFA World Cup, and was involved in controversy regarding street renamings, the loss of the city's Blue Flag beach status, illegally banning protests, banning posters, serious human rights abuses in the city's housing program, the failed privatisation of the city's bus system allegations of spin-doctoring, the unprofitable uShaka Marine World, threats to withdraw advertising from newspapers employing journalists critical of the municipality, lack of action against environmental destruction, favoritism toward ANC-aligned individuals and businesses - including S'bu and Shauwn Mpisane, the latter a convicted fraudster - unlawful and at times violent violations of the basic rights of street traders and shack dwellers and corruption.

In March 2011 the Sunday Times reported that he is under investigation for irregularities in housing contracts. Sutcliffe has denied that there has been fraud but has admitted to 'financial irregularities'.

Sutcliffe formerly held the position of chairperson of the Municipal Demarcation Board and was a member of the KwaZulu-Natal Provincial Legislature.

Born in Addington Hospital, in Durban, he has a PhD in geography from Ohio State University. In 2008 he received an award from the Association of American Geographers for distinguished public service.

References

Year of birth missing (living people)
Living people
People from Amanzimtoti
African National Congress politicians
Ohio State University Graduate School alumni